Mantas Šilkauskas (born 10 April 1988) is a Lithuanian decathlete, who also competed as hurdler. He competes international for Lithuania, but lives in United States.

He finished 23rd  in the octathlon at the 2005 World Youth Championships in Athletics in Marrakech.

Achievements

References

1988 births
Living people
Lithuanian decathletes
Lithuanian male hurdlers